Joseph Rankin Work (December 31, 1899 – February 11, 1960) was a professional American football player in the early National Football League with the Cleveland Indians and Cleveland Bulldogs. He began his football career playing at the high school level in Homestead, Pennsylvania. He then played at the college level for Miami University. He graduated from Miami in 1923.

References

Image of Joe Work at Miami

1899 births
1960 deaths
American football ends
Miami RedHawks football players
Cleveland Bulldogs players
Cleveland Indians (NFL 1923) players
People from Harrison County, West Virginia
Players of American football from West Virginia
Players of American football from Pennsylvania